Logobi (also written Logobie) may refer to:

Logobi, an urban musical genre originating from Africa
Logobi GT, French musical group of logobi music
"Logobitombo", also known as "Logobitombo (Corde à sauter)", a song by Moussier Tombola